The athletics competitions at the 2014 African Youth Games in Gaborone was held between 28 and 31 May at the Botswana National Stadium. The competition served as the qualification for the 2014 Summer Youth Olympics which took place in August in Nanjing, China.

Medal summary

Boys

Girls

Medal table

References

Official results (archived)
Results

African Youth Games
African Youth Games
2014
Athletics